The Embassy of the United States of America in Kyiv is the diplomatic mission of the United States to Ukraine.

History

The United States recognized the independence of Ukraine on December 26, 1991, and opened an embassy in its capital, Kyiv, on January 22, 1992. This first embassy was located in the former regional office of the Communist Party of Ukraine for Kyiv's Shevchenkivskyi District that was confiscated from the Communists soon after the 1991 August putsch in Moscow. That building was erected sometime in the 1950s on the grounds of the Ukrainian Greek Catholic Church of the Sacred Heart of Jesus on present day 10 Volodymyr Vynnychenko Street, destroyed by the Soviets in 1935. This was in the mold of other newly independent states in Eastern Europe, where former Communist Party offices were chosen as they were often cheap and expansive enough for the newly needed embassies.

In 2012, the embassy moved to its current 4.5 hectare (11.1 acres) location, acquired for $247 million. The embassy is on Igor Sikorsky Street, close to Kyiv’s western outskirts, and 15 minutes walk from Beresteiska station. Previously known as Tankova Street, the street was renamed by the City Council after Ukrainian-born aircraft design engineer Igor Sikorsky, due to a request from the embassy.

On June 8, 2017, a blast occurred outside the embassy.

During the 2021–2022 Russo-Ukrainian crisis, the embassy moved to Lviv, closer to the western border of the country with Poland, and adopted other security measures. As military buildup and tensions continued to rise, the embassy was relocated to Poland a couple days before Russia launched a full-scale invasion. The embassy was reopened on May 18, 2022.

Picketing
Since 2004, the embassy has been picketed annually on April 8 by the "Institute Republic" group of human rights activist Volodymyr Chemerys, due to the refusal of the US government to pay compensation for the death of Ukrainian journalist Taras Protsyuk, who perished in 2003 during the Iraq War.

Staff 
The U.S. Embassy in Kyiv is staffed by approximately 181 Americans and more than 560 Ukrainians.

The current Ambassador of the United States of America to Ukraine is Bridget Ann Brink. Ambassador Brink was nominated by President Biden to be U.S. Ambassador to Ukraine on April 25, 2022, confirmed unanimously by the U.S. Senate on May 18, 2022, and arrived in Kyiv on May 29, 2022.

Key U.S. Embassy officials include:
 Deputy Chief of Mission
 Political Counselor
 Economic Counselor
 Public Affairs Counselor
 Consul General
 Management Counselor
 Commercial Officer
 USAID Mission Director
 Regional Security Officer
 Department of Energy Director
 Agricultural Attaché
 Defense Attaché
 Peace Corps Director

List of chiefs of mission

See also
 Ukraine–United States relations
 List of diplomatic missions in Ukraine
 Embassy of Ukraine, Washington, D.C.
 Ambassadors of the United States to Ukraine
 Ambassadors of Ukraine to the United States

References

External links
 
 
 United States Department of State – Ukraine

Kyiv
United States
Ukraine–United States relations